Ivan Bašić (born 30 April 2002) is a Bosnian professional footballer who plays as a midfielder for Russian Premier League club Orenburg and the Bosnia and Herzegovina U21 national team.

Bašić started his professional career at Zrinjski Mostar, before joining Orenburg in 2022.

Club career

Early career
Bašić started playing football at Posušje, before joining Zrinjski Mostar's youth academy in 2018. He made his professional debut against Sloboda Tuzla on 22 August 2020 at the age of 18. On 16 May 2021, he scored his first professional goal in a triumph over Krupa.

In June 2022, he moved to Russian team Orenburg.

International career
Bašić represented Bosnia and Herzegovina at various youth levels.

Career statistics

Club

Honours
Zrinjski Mostar
Bosnian Premier League: 2021–22

References

External links

2002 births
People from Imotski
Citizens of Bosnia and Herzegovina through descent
Living people
Bosnia and Herzegovina footballers
Bosnia and Herzegovina youth international footballers
Bosnia and Herzegovina under-21 international footballers
Association football midfielders
HŠK Zrinjski Mostar players
FC Orenburg players
Premier League of Bosnia and Herzegovina players
Russian Premier League players
Bosnia and Herzegovina expatriate footballers
Expatriate footballers in Russia
Bosnia and Herzegovina expatriate sportspeople in Russia